Tuscola Township may refer to the following places in the United States:

 Tuscola Township, Douglas County, Illinois
 Tuscola Township, Tuscola County, Michigan

See also

Tuscola (disambiguation)

Township name disambiguation pages